Torsten Krebs (born 6 April 1973) is a German sport shooter who competed in the 2004 Summer Olympics.

References

1973 births
Living people
German male sport shooters
ISSF rifle shooters
Olympic shooters of Germany
Shooters at the 2004 Summer Olympics